D. graveolens may refer to two different plant species.  The specific epithet  means 'pungent.'

 Dittrichia graveolens, or stinkwort
 Durio graveolens, the red-fleshed durian